Aslan is the fictional lion in C. S. Lewis's Chronicles of Narnia.  

Aslan or Arsalan (both spellings of a Turkic word meaning "fearless", "warrior", "lion" ) may also refer to:

People

Given name

Arsalan
 Arsalan Anwar (born 1986), Pakistani cricketer
 Arsalan Iftikhar (born 1977), American human rights lawyer
 Arsalan Kamkar (born 1960), Iranian musician of Kurdish origin
 Arsalan Kazemi (born 1990), Iranian basketball player
 Arsi Nami Arsalan Nami (born 1984), Iranian singer-songwriter

Aslan
 Aslan Abashidze (born 1938), former leader of Adjara
 Aslan Atem (born 1991), Turkish wrestler
 Aslan-Beg Abashidze (1877–1924), Muslim Georgian nobleman and general
 Aslan Khan Daghestani (fl. early 18th-century), Safavid official
 Aslan bey Gardashov (1866–1920), Azerbaijani statesman 
 Aslan bey Safikurdski (1880–1937), Azerbaijani statesman
 Aslan-Bey Shervashidze, Prince of the Principality of Abkhazia from 180810 
 Aslan Dashayev (born 1989), Russian footballer
 Aslan Datdeyev (born 1973), Russian footballer
 Aslan Doguzov (born 1991), Russian footballer
 Aslan Dudiyev (born 1990), Russian footballer
 Aslan Dyshekov (born 1987), Russian footballer
 Aslan Dzeytov (born 1990), Russian footballer
 Aslan Dzharimov (born 1939), former president of the Republic of Adygea, Russia
 Aslan Goplachev (born 1970), Russian footballer and coach
 Aslan Karatsev (born 1993), Russian tennis player
 Aslan Khan Daghestani (born in the 17th century), early-18th-century Safavid dynasty official in Persia
 Aslan Kerimov (born 1973), footballer, most capped member of the Azerbaijan National Football Team
 Aslan Khuriyev (born 1984), Russian footballer
 Aslan Mashukov (born 1984), Russian footballer
 Aslan Maskhadov (1951–2005), Chechen leader
 Aslan Musin (born 1954), former Speaker of the Parliament of Kazakhstan
 Aslan Tkhakushinov (born 1947), President of the Republic of Adygea, Russia
 Aslan Tlebzu (born 1981), Russian folk musician of Adyghe origin
 Aslan Usoyan (1937–2013), Russian outlaw of Kurdish origin
 Aslan Zaseev (born 1982), Russian footballer

Surname

Aslan
 Ahmet Aslan (born 1968), Turkish musician
 Ali Aslan (born 1933), Syrian general and politician
 Ana Aslan (1897–1988), Romanian biologist, physician, and inventor
 Berkin Kamil Aslan (born 1992), Turkish footballer
 Beyzanur Aslan (born 2001), Azerbaijani women's footballer
 Ercüment Aslan (born 1976), Turkish boxer
 Emil Aslan (born 1978), Czech political scientist
 Faramarz Aslani (born 1954), Iranian singer-songwriter
 Farhad Aslani (born 1966), Iranian actor
 Grégoire Aslan (1908–1982), Armenian actor
 Hamdi Aslan (born 1967), Turkish footballer and coach
 Hatice Aslan (born 1962), Turkish actress
 Hidir Aslan (1958–1984), executed Turkish rebel
 Juan Contino Aslán (born 1969), Cuban politician
 Kemal Aslan (born 1981), Turkish footballer
 Kevork Aslan, Armenian historian
 Madalyn Aslan (born 1963), American astrologer
 Metin Aslan (born 1978), Austrian footballer of Turkish origin
 Murat Aslan (born 1986), Turkish volleyball player
 Nora Aslan (born 1937), Argentine artist
 Raoul Aslan (1886–1958), Austrian actor of Greek-Armenian ancestry 
 Reza Aslan (born 1972), Iranian-American author
 Yasin Aslan (born 1953), Turkish author
 Yiğit Aslan (born 2004), Turkish swimmer

Nickname 
 Aslan (artist) (Alain Gourdon; 1930–2014), French painter, sculptor, and pin-up artist
 Nihat Bekdik, Turkish footballer
 Kevork Chavush (1870–1907), Armenian fedayi leader and Armenian Revolutionary Federation member
 Aslan, nickname of Ali Pasha of Ioannina (1741–1822), pasha of western Rumelia

In fiction 
 Arslaan, a 2008 Indian fantasy television series based on the Persian epic of Amir Arsalan
 Arslan, or A Wind From Bukhara, a 1976 science fiction novel by M. J. Engh
 Arslan Senki, or The Heroic Legend of Arslan, a fantasy novel and manga series based on Persian history
 Aslan, a black warhorse in the manga series Red River
 Aslan, the name of a drug in the 2001 novel The Corrections by Jonathan Franzen
 Aslan Battour, the deceased father of Serge Battour in the manga series Kaze to Ki no Uta
 Aslan Jade Callenreese, alias Ash Lynx, the main character of the manga and anime series Banana Fish
 Kingdom of Arslan, a fictional Middle Eastern country and the setting of the manga series Area 88

Games 
 Aslan (Traveller), an extraterrestrial race from the Traveller roleplaying game
 Aslan (fanzine), a British roleplaying fanzine published in the 1980s

Places in West Asia
 Aslan, Izeh, a village in Izeh County, Khuzestan Province, Iran
 Arslan Tash, archaeological site in Aleppo, Syria 
 Aslan Duz, the capital of Aslan Duz District, Parsabad County, Ardabil Province, Iran
 Aslan Duz District, a district in Parsabad County, Ardabil Province, Iran
 Qezel Arsalan, a peak of the Mount Alvand range, Iran

Other uses 
 Aslan (band), an Irish rock band, formed in 1982
 Aslan Pasha Mosque, Ioannina, Greece
 Amir Arsalan, protagonist of the Persian epic Amir Arsalan-e Namdar
 Hyundai Aslan, a mid-size sedan sold in South Korea

See also
 Arslan, a given name and title
 Ruslan (given name)